M.I.C. (MIC男团) is a five-member Chinese boy band, which started in 2006 and released a debut EP in October 2010. The band has won some of the most important Asian entertainment business awards, including the Top Chinese Music Awards, Shanghai Media Group's "ERS Chinese Top Ten 2010" and the Vanguard 2010 Music Event, and released albums in 2011 and 2012.

History
In 2006, music company Taihe Rye Music sought to establish an ad-hoc boy band to become the next big thing in the Asian music market. Around 20 out of over 20,000 auditioned talents were chosen to become candidate members of the band, after a nationwide search in hundreds of performing arts schools in more than 20 provinces and cities. The candidates underwent four years of song and dance training. The final five candidates were selected after a talent show on Dragon TV, on March 26, 2010.

On July 27, 2010, M.I.C.'s debut single "Yàomìng de fánnǎo" ("Terrible trouble") was released, and the EP "ROCK STAR" followed in October. "Bàn mèng" ("Semi-dream") was a hit in August 2011, and the music video for another single, "Fēngbào xiàtiān" ("Storm summer"), became the most watched music video of August 2011.

Their first full-length album, V, was released in 2011, with "Get It Hot" as the first single.

Members
Phibian (Wang Hao)
Steelo Z. (Zhao YongXin)
Aero (Xiao Shunyao)
CJ Swag (Chi YueHan)
JC-T Tan Jianci

Discography

Albums
Rock Star (2010, Taihe Rye Music)

V (2011, Taihe Rye)

色.Color (2012, Taihe Rye)

SOLO (2014, Taihe Rye)

M.I.C. (2017, Taihe Rye)

Singles
Believe in the Future 相信未来 (2013) 
Dream Chasing Legend 逐梦传奇 (2015) 
Angel Beside Me 天使在我身边 (2016)
Beautiful Myth 美丽的神话 (2016) 
Super Magic Century 非常魔法世纪 (2011) 
Storm in the Summer 风暴夏天  (2011) 
Half Dream 半梦 (2011) 
The Pipa Drumming On My Heartstrings 弹起我心爱的土琵琶  (2011)
Sweet Dreams (2010) 
Poker Face (2010) 
Lollipop  (2010)
Beyond the Game (2009)

Concerts
X Party (2012)

Filmography
In the name of light and a dream 以光与梦之名 (2012) 
Love's Time Machine 90后青春手写体——爱的时光机 (2012) 
M.I.C (M.I.C.男团) (2012) (Self-titled manga released on Comic Guests) 
Let's Shake It 舞林大会 (2012) 
Hua Yang Jiang Hu 花样江湖 (2015) 
New Opera Show 国色天香 (2015)

Recognitions
2014 Music Radio China Top Music Awards: 
Most Popular Group (China)
 Most Popular Campus Group 
2014 2nd V Chart Awards: 
Most Trendy Artist
Best Group (China)
2014 Chinese Golden Bell Award for Music: Group Award (Gold) 
2013 TVB8 Mandarin Music On Demand Awards: 
Best Group 
Best Song (Drunk Part 2) 
Most Popular Male Singer
2013 9+2 Music Pioneer Awards: Online Popular Group 
2013 Chinese Music Media Awards: Best Dance Song (Color) 
2013 MSN Fashion Awards: Best Musical Group
2013 Music Radio China Top Music Awards: Most Popular Group (China)
2013 1st V Chart Awards: Best Group (China)
2013 Hong Kong Asian-Pop Music Festival:
Best Stage Interpretation
Weibo Popularity Award
Asian New Star Award 
2012 Migu Music Awards: Most Popular Group (China)
2012 TVB8 Mandarin Music On Demand Awards:
Most Popular Male Singer (China)
Most Popular Group 
Golden Song Award
2012 Beijing Pop Music Awards: Most Popular Group 
2011 CCTV Finding the Most Beautiful Voice: Champion 
2011 TVB8 Mandarin Music On Demand Awards: Most Popular Group (Bronze) 
2011 4th Top Chinese Music Chart Breakthrough New Artist Awards: Best Group
2011 11th Chinese Music Media Awards: Best Dance Artist 
5th Migu Music Awards: Best Selling Newcomer
2011 Music Radio China Top Music Awards:
Best Golden Song (Rock Star) 
 Most Popular Campus Group 
2011 15th China Music Awards: Best Newcomer 
2011 11th TOP Chinese Music Awards:
New Force of the Year
Best Newcomer
2011 9+2 Music Pioneer Awards:
Trendy Dance Group
Trendy New Group 
2011 18th ERC Chinese Top Ten Music Awards: Newcomer Award (Silver)
2011 Beijing Pop Music Awards: Golden Song Award (Rock Star) 
2010 3rd Top Chinese Music Chart Breakthrough New Artist Awards: Best New Group
5th Fans Anniversary Award: Most Commercially Valuable Prize
2010 Migu Music Academy: Champion

References

Musical groups established in 2006
Chinese boy bands
2006 establishments in China